Hawalli Governorate ( Muḥāfaẓat Ḥawalli), is one of the six governorates of Kuwait, consisting of the following areas:
Hawalli
Bayan
Mishref
Maidan Hawalli
Jabriya
Rumaithiya
Salmiya
Salwa
Shaab
 Al-salam
 Hattin
 Al-Zahra
 Mubarak Al-Abdullah Al Jaber (West Mishref)
 Al-shuhada
 Al-badae
 Al-Siddiq
Nawaf Al-Ahmad Al-Jaber Al-Sabah become governor in 1962. A more recent governor of the Hawalli governorate is Ahmad Nawaf Al-Ahmad Al-Sabah, now prime minister.

A 2005 estimate reported the population of Hawalli to be 393,861.

A 31 December 2007 estimate reported Hawalli's population to be 714,876.

As of June 2014, the population of Hawalli is estimated to be 890,533.

Sports
Qadsia SC and Al-Salmiya SC are situated in Hawalli governorate

Notable people
Abdallah Abdalrahman Alruwaished
Kazem Abal
Ibrahim Khraibut
Abdulrasool Abdulreda Behbehani, former President of State Department for Legal Advice and Legislation

References

 
Governorates of Kuwait